The İzmit Clock Tower (Turkish: İzmit Saat Kulesi) in İzmit, Turkey is one of many clock towers that were built throughout the Ottoman Empire as a result of the decree which was sent to the provincial governors to commemorate the 25th anniversary of Sultan Abdülhamid II's ascension to the Ottoman throne. It was designed by architect Vedat Tek upon the order of Musa Kazım Bey, the governor of İzmit, and built in 1902. Other sources name the architect of the tower as Mihran Azaryan who was an Armenian-Ottoman of Izmit origin.

The neoclassical clock tower, which stands just in front of the Hünkar Pavilion of Sultan Abdülaziz, has four floors with dimensions . The ground floor houses fountains, while the clock is on the top floor. All four facades of the middle floors are decorated with the seal of Sultan Abdülhamid II. The pointed cone on top is coated with lead. 

The clock tower has been an inseparable part of the history of İzmit throughout the 20th century, and has become the symbol of the city.

In the former Balkan provinces of the Ottoman Empire, particularly in present-day Serbian, Bosnian and Montenegrin towns such as Belgrade, Prijepolje, Sarajevo, Banja Luka, Gradačac and Stara Varoš, similar Ottoman era clock towers are still named Sahat Kula (deriving from the Turkish words Saat Kulesi, meaning Clock Tower.)

It was restored in 2006.

References

See also
Büyük Saat, Antalya
Dolmabahçe Clock Tower, Istanbul
Etfal Hospital Clock Tower, Istanbul
İzmir Clock Tower, Izmir
Nusretiye Clock Tower, Istanbul
Yıldız Clock Tower, Istanbul

Clock towers in Turkey
Buildings and structures in İzmit
Towers completed in 1902
Neoclassical architecture in Turkey
Tourist attractions in Kocaeli Province
Ottoman clock towers
Vedat Tek buildings